Bad Moon, also known as E yue, is a 2005 Taiwanese film directed by Willing Lu and Chi Yin. Produced by Central Motion Picture Corporation, the film is 98 minutes long. Bad Moon was previously titled Devil's Holiday and is a horror and thriller film.

Bad Moon explores how mental illness may have driven a girl to jump from a building. It was largely filmed late at night which disrupted actor Lam Lei's circadian rhythm and was agonising for him.

Apple Daily film critic Zhuang Youfen praised the film, writing, "The plot is suspenseful and compact, and the audience can enjoy the fun of reasoning." Bad Moon had an underwhelming performance at the box office.

References

External links 
 Bad Moon at the Bureau of Audiovisual and Music Industry Development
 Bad Moon at the Hong Kong Movie DataBase
 

2005 horror films
2005 thriller films
Central Motion Picture Corporation films
2000s Mandarin-language films
Taiwanese horror thriller films